Bhola-4 is a constituency represented in the Jatiya Sangsad (National Parliament) of Bangladesh since 2008 by Abdullah Al Islam Jacob of the Awami League.

Boundaries 
The constituency encompasses Char Fasson and Manpura upazilas.

History 
The constituency was created in 1984 from a Bakerganj constituency when the former Bakerganj District was split into four districts: Bhola, Bakerganj, Jhalokati, and Pirojpur.

Members of Parliament

Elections

Elections in the 2010s 
Abdullah Al Islam Jacob was re-elected unopposed in the 2014 general election after opposition parties withdrew their candidacies in a boycott of the election.

Elections in the 2000s

Elections in the 1990s 

M. M. Nazrul Islam died in office in September 1992. Jafar Ullah Chowdhury was elected in a December 1992 by-election.

References

External links
 

Parliamentary constituencies in Bangladesh
Bhola District